Barney & Clyde is a daily newspaper comic strip created by Washington Post columnist Gene Weingarten,  his son Dan Weingarten, and cartoonist David Clark. Syndicated by The Washington Post Writers Group, it debuted on June 7, 2010. It appears in The Washington Post, The Miami Herald, The Detroit Free Press and many other newspapers. On Father's Day 2010, Gene Weingarten wrote about how their collaboration began.

Characters and story
Barney & Clyde is about the friendship between a billionaire and a homeless man. The title characters are J. Barnard Pillsbury, owner and CEO of multinational drug company Pillsbury Pharmaceuticals, and homeless Clyde Finster. Other prominent characters are Barney's second wife Lucretia Pillsbury, Barney's 11-year-old daughter from his first marriage Cynthia Pillsbury, and Clyde's homeless friend Dabney Mountbatten IV. Clyde also cares for a  rabbit named  Adolf.  When panhandling, Clyde refers to Adolf by his stage name, Fluffykins McNeedsahug.

In 2011, Florida resident Horace LaBadie began suggesting scripts to the creators. In time, he became a frequent contributor to the strip. The Weingartens invented a street denizen named Horace who tells arcane jokes other characters do not understand.

References

External links

2010 comics debuts
American comic strips
Fictional businesspeople
Fictional beggars
Comic strip duos
Comics characters introduced in 2010
Comics set in the United States
Gag-a-day comics